The Anglican Church of St Peter and St Paul in Chiselborough, Somerset, England was built in the 12th century. It is a Grade II* listed building.

History

The church was built in the 12th century with parts of the original fabric being included in later work. In the 17th the chancel was added. In 1842 a Victorian restoration included rebuilding of the nave.

The parish is part of the Ham Hill benefice within the Diocese of Bath and Wells.

Architecture

The hamstone building has Welsh slate roofs. It consists of a five-bay nave and two-bay chancel. The two-stage tower has a low parapet and short octagonal spire. The central tower is decorated with gargoyles. The tower includes a bell which was cast in 1363.

The interior has mostly 19th century fittings but the font is believed to date from the 15th century. One of the stained glass windows which was installed in 1988 is made up of 99 panes dedicated to the children of the village.

See also  
 List of ecclesiastical parishes in the Diocese of Bath and Wells

References

Grade II* listed buildings in South Somerset
Grade II* listed churches in Somerset
Church of England church buildings in South Somerset